In vitro fertilisation (IVF) is a process of fertilisation where an egg is combined with sperm in vitro ("in glass"). The process involves monitoring and stimulating a female's ovulatory process, removing an ovum or ova (egg or eggs) from their ovaries and letting sperm fertilise them in a culture medium in a laboratory. After the fertilised egg (zygote) undergoes embryo culture for 2–6 days, it is transferred by catheter into the uterus, with the intention of establishing a successful pregnancy.

IVF is a type of assisted reproductive technology used for infertility treatment, gestational surrogacy, and, in combination with pre-implantation genetic testing, avoiding transmission of genetic conditions. A fertilised egg from a donor may implant into a surrogate's uterus, and the resulting child is genetically unrelated to the surrogate. Some countries have banned or otherwise regulate the availability of IVF treatment, giving rise to fertility tourism. Restrictions on the availability of IVF include costs and age, in order for a woman to carry a healthy pregnancy to term. Children born through IVF are commonly called test tube babies.

In July 1978, Louise Brown was the first child successfully born after her mother received IVF treatment. Brown was born as a result of natural-cycle IVF, where no stimulation was made. The procedure took place at Dr Kershaw's Cottage Hospital (now Dr Kershaw's Hospice) in Royton, Oldham, England. Robert G. Edwards was awarded the Nobel Prize in Physiology or Medicine in 2010. The physiologist co-developed the treatment together with Patrick Steptoe and embryologist Jean Purdy but the latter two were not eligible for consideration as they had died and the Nobel Prize is not awarded posthumously.

With egg donation and IVF, women who are past their reproductive years, have infertile partners, have idiopathic female-fertility issues, or have reached menopause can still become pregnant. After the IVF treatment, some couples get pregnant without any fertility treatments. In 2018, it was estimated that eight million children had been born worldwide using IVF and other assisted reproduction techniques. A 2019 study that explores 10 adjuncts with IVF (screening hysteroscopy, DHEA, testosterone, GH, aspirin, heparin, antioxidants in males and females, seminal plasma and PRP) suggests that until more evidence is done to show that these adjuncts are safe and effective, they should be avoided.

Terminology
The Latin term in vitro, meaning "in glass", is used because early biological experiments involving cultivation of tissues outside the living organism were carried out in glass containers, such as beakers, test tubes, or Petri dishes. Today, the scientific term "in vitro" is used to refer to any biological procedure that is performed outside the organism in which it would normally have occurred, to distinguish it from an in vivo procedure (such as in vivo fertilisation), where the tissue remains inside the living organism in which it is normally found.

A colloquial term for babies conceived as the result of IVF, "test tube babies", refers to the tube-shaped containers of glass or plastic resin, called test tubes, that are commonly used in chemistry and biology labs. However, IVF is usually performed in Petri dishes, which are both wider and shallower and often used to cultivate cultures.

In a broader sense, IVF is a form of assisted reproductive technology (ART).

Medical uses

Indications

IVF may be used to overcome female infertility when it is due to problems with the fallopian tubes, making in vivo fertilisation difficult. It can also assist in male infertility, in those cases where there is a defect in sperm quality; in such situations intracytoplasmic sperm injection (ICSI) may be used, where a sperm cell is injected directly into the egg cell. This is used when sperm has difficulty penetrating the egg. In these cases the partner's or a donor's sperm may be used. ICSI is also used when sperm numbers are very low. When indicated, the use of ICSI has been found to increase the success rates of IVF.

According to UK's National Institute for Health and Care Excellence (NICE) guidelines, IVF treatment is appropriate in cases of unexplained infertility for women who have not conceived after 2 years of regular unprotected sexual intercourse.

In women with anovulation, it may be an alternative after 7–12 attempted cycles of ovulation induction, since the latter is expensive and more easy to control.

Success rates
IVF success rates are the percentage of all IVF procedures that result in favourable outcomes. Depending on the type of calculation used, this outcome may represent the number of confirmed pregnancies, called the pregnancy rate, or the number of live births, called the live birth rate. The success rate depends on variable factors such as maternal age, cause of infertility, embryo status, reproductive history, and lifestyle factors.

Maternal age: Younger candidates of IVF are more likely to get pregnant. Females older than 41 are more likely to get pregnant with a donor egg.

Reproductive history: women who have been previously pregnant are in many cases more successful with IVF treatments than those who have never been pregnant.

Due to advances in reproductive technology, live birth rates by cycle five of IVF have increased from 76% in 2005 to 80% in 2010 despite a reduction in the number of embryos being transferred (which decreased the multiple birth rate from 25% to 8%).

Live birth rate
The live birth rate is the percentage of all IVF cycles that lead to a live birth. This rate does not include miscarriage or stillbirth;  multiple-order births, such as twins and triplets, are counted as one pregnancy. A 2019 summary compiled by the Society for Assisted Reproductive Technology (SART) which reports the average IVF success rates in the United States per age group using non-donor eggs compiled the following data:

In 2006, Canadian clinics reported a live birth rate of 27%. Birth rates in younger patients were slightly higher, with a success rate of 35.3% for those 21 and younger, the youngest group evaluated. Success rates for older patients were also lower and decrease with age, with 37-year-olds at 27.4% and no live births for those older than 48, the oldest group evaluated. Some clinics exceeded these rates, but it is impossible to determine if that is due to superior technique or patient selection, since it is possible to artificially increase success rates by refusing to accept the most difficult patients or by steering them into oocyte donation cycles (which are compiled separately). Further, pregnancy rates can be increased by the placement of several embryos at the risk of increasing the chance for multiples.

Because not each IVF cycle that is started will lead to oocyte retrieval or embryo transfer, reports of live birth rates need to specify the denominator, namely IVF cycles started, IVF retrievals, or embryo transfers. The SART summarised 2008–9 success rates for US clinics for fresh embryo cycles that did not involve donor eggs and gave live birth rates by the age of the prospective mother, with a peak at 41.3% per cycle started and 47.3% per embryo transfer for patients under 35 years of age.

IVF attempts in multiple cycles result in increased cumulative live birth rates. Depending on the demographic group, one study reported 45% to 53% for three attempts, and 51% to 71% to 80% for six attempts.

Effective from 15 February 2021 the majority of Australian IVF clinics publish their individual success rate online via YourIVFSuccess.com.au. This site also contains a predictor tool.

Pregnancy rate
Pregnancy rate may be defined in various ways. In the United States, SART and the Centers for Disease Control (and appearing in the table in the Success Rates section above) include statistics on positive pregnancy test and clinical pregnancy rate.

The 2019 summary compiled by the SART the following data for non-donor eggs (first embryo transfer) in the United States:

In 2006, Canadian clinics reported an average pregnancy rate of 35%. A French study estimated that 66% of patients starting IVF treatment finally succeed in having a child (40% during the IVF treatment at the centre and 26% after IVF discontinuation). Achievement of having a child after IVF discontinuation was mainly due to adoption (46%) or spontaneous pregnancy (42%).

Miscarriage rate
According to a study done by the Mayo Clinic miscarriage rates for IVF are somewhere between 15 and 25%.

Predictors of success
The main potential factors that influence pregnancy (and live birth) rates in IVF have been suggested to be maternal age, duration of infertility or subfertility, bFSH and number of oocytes, all reflecting ovarian function. Optimal woman's age is 23–39 years at time of treatment.

Biomarkers that affect the pregnancy chances of IVF include:
 Antral follicle count, with higher count giving higher success rates.
 Anti-Müllerian hormone levels, with higher levels indicating higher chances of pregnancy, as well as of live birth after IVF, even after adjusting for age.
 Level of DNA fragmentation as measured, e.g. by Comet assay, advanced maternal age and semen quality.
 Women with ovary-specific FMR1 genotypes including het-norm/low have significantly decreased pregnancy chances in IVF.
Progesterone elevation on the day of induction of final maturation is associated with lower pregnancy rates in IVF cycles in women undergoing ovarian stimulation using GnRH analogues and gonadotrophins. At this time, compared to a progesterone level below 0.8 ng/ml, a level between 0.8 and 1.1 ng/ml confers an odds ratio of pregnancy of approximately 0.8, and a level between 1.2 and 3.0 ng/ml confers an odds ratio of pregnancy of between 0.6 and 0.7. On the other hand, progesterone elevation does not seem to confer a decreased chance of pregnancy in frozen–thawed cycles and cycles with egg donation.
 Characteristics of cells from the cumulus oophorus and the membrana granulosa, which are easily aspirated during oocyte retrieval. These cells are closely associated with the oocyte and share the same microenvironment, and the rate of expression of certain genes in such cells are associated with higher or lower pregnancy rate.
 An endometrial thickness (EMT) of less than 7 mm decreases the pregnancy rate by an odds ratio of approximately 0.4 compared to an EMT of over 7 mm. However, such low thickness rarely occurs, and any routine use of this parameter is regarded as not justified.

Other determinants of outcome of IVF include:
 As the maternal age increases, the likelihood of conception decreases and the chance of miscarriage increases.
With increasing paternal age, especially 50 years and older, the rate of blastocyst formation decreases.
 Tobacco smoking reduces the chances of IVF producing a live birth by 34% and increases the risk of an IVF pregnancy miscarrying by 30%.
 A body mass index (BMI) over 27 causes a 33% decrease in likelihood to have a live birth after the first cycle of IVF, compared to those with a BMI between 20 and 27. Also, pregnant females who are obese have higher rates of miscarriage, gestational diabetes, hypertension, thromboembolism and problems during delivery, as well as leading to an increased risk of fetal congenital abnormality. Ideal body mass index is 19–30.
 Salpingectomy or laparoscopic tubal occlusion before IVF treatment increases chances for women with hydrosalpinges.
 Success with previous pregnancy and/or live birth increases chances
 Low alcohol/caffeine intake increases success rate
 The number of embryos transferred in the treatment cycle
 Embryo quality
 Some studies also suggest that autoimmune disease may also play a role in decreasing IVF success rates by interfering with the proper implantation of the embryo after transfer.

Aspirin is sometimes prescribed to women for the purpose of increasing the chances of conception by IVF, but  there was no evidence to show that it is safe and effective.

A 2013 review and meta analysis of randomised controlled trials of acupuncture as an adjuvant therapy in IVF found no overall benefit, and concluded that an apparent benefit detected in a subset of published trials where the control group (those not using acupuncture) experienced a lower than average rate of pregnancy requires further study, due to the possibility of publication bias and other factors.

A Cochrane review came to the result that endometrial injury performed in the month prior to ovarian induction appeared to increase both the live birth rate and clinical pregnancy rate in IVF compared with no endometrial injury. There was no evidence of a difference between the groups in miscarriage, multiple pregnancy or bleeding rates. Evidence suggested that endometrial injury on the day of oocyte retrieval was associated with a lower live birth or ongoing pregnancy rate.

Intake of antioxidants (such as N-acetyl-cysteine, melatonin, vitamin A, vitamin C, vitamin E, folic acid, myo-inositol, zinc or selenium) has not been associated with a significantly increased live birth rate or clinical pregnancy rate in IVF according to Cochrane reviews. The review found that oral antioxidants given to  men in couples with male factor or unexplained subfertility may improve live birth rates, but more evidence is needed.

A Cochrane review in 2015 came to the result that there is no evidence identified regarding the effect of preconception lifestyle advice on the chance of a live birth outcome.

Complications

Multiple births
The major complication of IVF is the risk of multiple births. This is directly related to the practice of transferring multiple embryos at embryo transfer. Multiple births are related to increased risk of pregnancy loss, obstetrical complications, prematurity, and neonatal morbidity with the potential for long term damage. Strict limits on the number of embryos that may be transferred have been enacted in some countries (e.g. Britain, Belgium) to reduce the risk of high-order multiples (triplets or more), but are not universally followed or accepted. Spontaneous splitting of embryos in the womb after transfer can occur, but this is rare and would lead to identical twins. There is some evidence that making a double embryo transfer during one cycle achieves a higher live birth rate than a single embryo transfer; but making two single embryo transfers in two cycles has the same live birth rate and would avoid multiple pregnancies.

Sex ratio distortions

Certain kinds of IVF, in particular ICSI (first applied in 1991) and blastocyst transfer (first applied in 1984) have been shown to lead to distortions in the sex ratio at birth. ICSI leads to slightly more female births (51.3% female) while blastocyst transfer leads to significantly more male births (56.1% male). Standard IVF done at the second or third day leads to a normal sex ratio.

Epigenetic modifications caused by extended culture leading to the death of more female embryos has been theorized as the reason why blastocyst transfer leads to a higher male sex ratio; however, adding retinoic acid to the culture can bring this ratio back to normal. A second theory is that the male-biased sex ratio may due to a higher rate of selection of male embryos. Male embryos develop faster in-vitro, and thus may appear more viable for transfer.

Spread of infectious disease
By sperm washing, the risk that a chronic disease in the individual providing the sperm would infect the female or offspring can be brought to negligible levels.

In males with hepatitis B, The Practice Committee of the American Society for Reproductive Medicine advises that sperm washing is not necessary in IVF to prevent transmission, unless the female partner has not been effectively vaccinated. In females with hepatitis B, the risk of vertical transmission during IVF is no different from the risk in spontaneous conception. However, there is not enough evidence to say that ICSI procedures are safe in females with hepatitis B in regard to vertical transmission to the offspring.

Regarding potential spread of HIV/AIDS, Japan's government prohibited the use of IVF procedures for couples in which both partners are infected with HIV. Despite the fact that the ethics committees previously allowed the Ogikubo, Tokyo Hospital, located in Tokyo, to use IVF for couples with HIV, the Ministry of Health, Labour and Welfare of Japan decided to block the practice. Hideji Hanabusa, the vice president of the Ogikubo Hospital, states that together with his colleagues, he managed to develop a method through which scientists are able to remove HIV from sperm.

Other risks to the egg provider/retriever
A risk of ovarian stimulation is the development of ovarian hyperstimulation syndrome, particularly if hCG is used for inducing final oocyte maturation. This results in swollen, painful ovaries. It occurs in 30% of patients. Mild cases can be treated with over the counter medications and cases can be resolved in the absence of pregnancy. In moderate cases, ovaries swell and fluid accumulated in the abdominal cavities and may have symptoms of heartburn, gas, nausea or loss of appetite. In severe cases patients have sudden excess abdominal pain, nausea, vomiting and will result in hospitalisation.

During egg retrieval, there exists a small chance of bleeding, infection, and damage to surrounding structures such as bowel and bladder (transvaginal ultrasound aspiration) as well as difficulty in breathing, chest infection, allergic reactions to medication, or nerve damage (laparoscopy).

Ectopic pregnancy may also occur if a fertilised egg develops outside the uterus, usually in the fallopian tubes and requires immediate destruction of the fetus.

IVF does not seem to be associated with an elevated risk of cervical cancer, nor with ovarian cancer or endometrial cancer when neutralising the confounder of infertility itself. Nor does it seem to impart any increased risk for breast cancer.

Regardless of pregnancy result, IVF treatment is usually stressful for patients. Neuroticism and the use of escapist coping strategies are associated with a higher degree of distress, while the presence of social support has a relieving effect. A negative pregnancy test after IVF is associated with an increased risk for depression in women, but not with any increased risk of developing anxiety disorders. Pregnancy test results do not seem to be a risk factor for depression or anxiety among men.

Studies show that there is an increased risk of venous thrombosis or pulmonary embolism during the first trimester of IVF.  When looking at long-term studies comparing women who received or did not receive IVF, there seems to be no correlation with increased risk of cardiac events. There are more ongoing studies to solidify this.

Spontaneous pregnancy has occurred after successful and unsuccessful IVF treatments. Within 2 years of delivering an infant conceived through IVF, subfertile couples had a conception rate of 18%.

Birth defects
A review in 2013 came to the result that infants resulting from IVF (with or without ICSI) have a relative risk of birth defects of 1.32 (95% confidence interval 1.24–1.42) compared to naturally conceived infants. In 2008, an analysis of the data of the National Birth Defects Study in the US found that certain birth defects were significantly more common in infants conceived through IVF, notably septal heart defects, cleft lip with or without cleft palate, esophageal atresia, and anorectal atresia; the mechanism of causality is unclear. However, in a population-wide cohort study of 308,974 births (with 6,163 using assisted reproductive technology and following children from birth to age five) researchers found: "The increased risk of birth defects associated with IVF was no longer significant after adjustment for parental factors." Parental factors included known independent risks for birth defects such as maternal age, smoking status, etc. Multivariate correction did not remove the significance of the association of birth defects and ICSI (corrected odds ratio 1.57), although the authors speculate that underlying male infertility factors (which would be associated with the use of ICSI) may contribute to this observation and were not able to correct for these confounders. The authors also found that a history of infertility elevated risk itself in the absence of any treatment (odds ratio 1.29), consistent with a Danish national registry study  and "implicates patient factors in this increased risk." The authors of the Danish national registry study speculate: "our results suggest that the reported increased prevalence of congenital malformations seen in singletons born after assisted reproductive technology is partly due to the underlying infertility or its determinants."

Other risks to the offspring
If the underlying infertility is related to abnormalities in spermatogenesis, it is plausible, but too early to examine that male offspring are at higher risk for sperm abnormalities.

IVF does not seem to confer any risks regarding cognitive development, school performance, social functioning, and behaviour. Also, IVF infants are known to be as securely attached to their parents as those who were naturally conceived, and IVF adolescents are as well-adjusted as those who have been naturally conceived.

Limited long-term follow-up data suggest that IVF may be associated with an increased incidence of hypertension, impaired fasting glucose, increase in total body fat composition, advancement of bone age, subclinical thyroid disorder, early adulthood clinical depression and binge drinking in the offspring. It is not known, however, whether these potential associations are caused by the IVF procedure in itself, by adverse obstetric outcomes associated with IVF, by the genetic origin of the children or by yet unknown IVF-associated causes. Increases in embryo manipulation during IVF result in more deviant fetal growth curves, but birth weight does not seem to be a reliable marker of fetal stress.

IVF, including ICSI, is associated with an increased risk of imprinting disorders (including Prader-Willi syndrome and Angelman syndrome), with an odds ratio of 3.7 (95% confidence interval 1.4 to 9.7).

An IVF-associated incidence of cerebral palsy and neurodevelopmental delay are believed to be related to the confounders of prematurity and low birthweight. Similarly, an IVF-associated incidence of autism and attention-deficit disorder are believed to be related to confounders of maternal and obstetric factors.

Overall, IVF does not cause an increased risk of childhood cancer. Studies have shown a decrease in the risk of certain cancers and an increased risks of certain others including retinoblastoma, hepatoblastoma and rhabdomyosarcoma.

Method

Theoretically, IVF could be performed by collecting the contents from the fallopian tubes or uterus after natural ovulation, mixing it with sperm, and reinserting the fertilised ova into the uterus. However, without additional techniques, the chances of pregnancy would be extremely small. The additional techniques that are routinely used in IVF include ovarian hyperstimulation to generate multiple eggs, ultrasound-guided transvaginal oocyte retrieval directly from the ovaries, co-incubation of eggs and sperm, as well as culture and selection of resultant embryos before embryo transfer into a uterus.

Ovarian hyperstimulation

Ovarian hyperstimulation is the stimulation to induce development of multiple follicles of the ovaries. It should start with response prediction by e.g. age, antral follicle count and level of anti-Müllerian hormone. The resulting prediction of e.g. poor or hyper-response to ovarian hyperstimulation determines the protocol and dosage for ovarian hyperstimulation.

Ovarian hyperstimulation also includes suppression of spontaneous ovulation, for which two main methods are available: Using a (usually longer) GnRH agonist protocol or a (usually shorter) GnRH antagonist protocol. In a standard long GnRH agonist protocol the day when hyperstimulation treatment is started and the expected day of later oocyte retrieval can be chosen to conform to personal choice, while in a GnRH antagonist protocol it must be adapted to the spontaneous onset of the previous menstruation. On the other hand, the GnRH antagonist protocol has a lower risk of ovarian hyperstimulation syndrome (OHSS), which is a life-threatening complication.

For the ovarian hyperstimulation in itself, injectable gonadotropins (usually FSH analogues) are generally used under close monitoring. Such monitoring frequently checks the estradiol level and, by means of gynecologic ultrasonography, follicular growth. Typically approximately 10 days of injections will be necessary.

Natural IVF

There are several methods termed natural cycle IVF:
 IVF using no drugs for ovarian hyperstimulation, while drugs for ovulation suppression may still be used.
 IVF using ovarian hyperstimulation, including gonadotropins, but with a GnRH antagonist protocol so that the cycle initiates from natural mechanisms.
 Frozen embryo transfer; IVF using ovarian hyperstimulation, followed by embryo cryopreservation, followed by embryo transfer in a later, natural, cycle.

IVF using no drugs for ovarian hyperstimulation was the method for the conception of Louise Brown. This method can be successfully used when women want to avoid taking ovarian stimulating drugs with its associated side-effects. HFEA has estimated the live birth rate to be approximately 1.3% per IVF cycle using no hyperstimulation drugs for women  aged between 40 and 42.

Mild IVF is a method where a small dose of ovarian stimulating drugs are used for a short duration during a natural menstrual cycle aimed at producing 2–7 eggs and creating healthy embryos. This method appears to be an advance in the field to reduce complications and side-effects for women, and it is aimed at quality, and not quantity of eggs and embryos. One study comparing a mild treatment (mild ovarian stimulation with GnRH antagonist co-treatment combined with single embryo transfer) to a standard treatment (stimulation with a GnRH agonist long-protocol and transfer of two embryos) came to the result that the proportions of cumulative pregnancies that resulted in term live birth after 1 year were 43.4% with mild treatment and 44.7% with standard treatment. Mild IVF can be cheaper than conventional IVF and with a significantly reduced risk of multiple gestation and OHSS.

Final maturation induction

When the ovarian follicles have reached a certain degree of development, induction of final oocyte maturation is performed, generally by an injection of human chorionic gonadotropin (hCG). Commonly, this is known as the "trigger shot." hCG acts as an analogue of luteinising hormone, and ovulation would occur between 38 and 40 hours after a single HCG injection, but the egg retrieval is performed at a time usually between 34 and 36 hours after hCG injection, that is, just prior to when the follicles would rupture. This avails for scheduling the egg retrieval procedure at a time where the eggs are fully mature. HCG injection confers a risk of ovarian hyperstimulation syndrome. Using a GnRH agonist instead of hCG eliminates most of the risk of ovarian hyperstimulation syndrome, but with a reduced delivery rate if the embryos are transferred fresh.  For this reason, many centers will freeze all oocytes or embryos following agonist trigger.

Egg retrieval

The eggs are retrieved from the patient using a transvaginal technique called transvaginal oocyte retrieval, involving an ultrasound-guided needle piercing the vaginal wall to reach the ovaries. Through this needle follicles can be aspirated, and the follicular fluid is passed to an embryologist to identify ova. It is common to remove between ten and thirty eggs. The retrieval procedure usually takes between 20 and 40 minutes, depending on the number of mature follicles, and is usually done under conscious sedation or general anaesthesia.

Egg and sperm preparation
In the laboratory, for ICSI treatments, the identified eggs are stripped of surrounding cells (also known as cumulus cells) and prepared for fertilisation. An oocyte selection may be performed prior to fertilisation to select eggs that can be fertilised, as it is required they are in metaphase II. There are cases in which if oocytes are in the metaphase I stage, they can be kept being cultured so as to undergo a posterior sperm injection. In the meantime, semen is prepared for fertilisation by removing inactive cells and seminal fluid in a process called sperm washing. If semen is being provided by a sperm donor, it will usually have been prepared for treatment before being frozen and quarantined, and it will be thawed ready for use.

Co-incubation

The sperm and the egg are incubated together at a ratio of about 75,000:1 in a culture media in order for the actual fertilisation to take place. A review in 2013 came to the result that a duration of this co-incubation of about 1 to 4 hours results in significantly higher pregnancy rates than 16 to 24 hours. In most cases, the egg will be fertilised during co-incubation and will show two pronuclei. In certain situations, such as low sperm count or motility, a single sperm may be injected directly into the egg using intracytoplasmic sperm injection (ICSI). The fertilised egg is passed to a special growth medium and left for about 48 hours until the egg consists of six to eight cells.

In gamete intrafallopian transfer, eggs are removed from the woman and placed in one of the fallopian tubes, along with the man's sperm. This allows fertilisation to take place inside the woman's body. Therefore, this variation is actually an in vivo fertilisation, not in vitro.

Embryo culture

The main durations of embryo culture are until cleavage stage (day two to four after co-incubation) or the blastocyst stage (day five or six after co-incubation). Embryo culture until the blastocyst stage confers a significant increase in live birth rate per embryo transfer, but also confers a decreased number of embryos available for transfer and embryo cryopreservation, so the cumulative clinical pregnancy rates are increased with cleavage stage transfer. Transfer day two instead of day three after fertilisation has no differences in live birth rate. There are significantly higher odds of preterm birth (odds ratio 1.3) and congenital anomalies (odds ratio 1.3) among births having from embryos cultured until the blastocyst stage compared with cleavage stage.

Embryo selection

Laboratories have developed grading methods to judge ovocyte and embryo quality. In order to optimise pregnancy rates, there is significant evidence that a morphological scoring system is the best strategy for the selection of embryos. Since 2009 where the first time-lapse microscopy system for IVF was approved for clinical use, morphokinetic scoring systems has shown to improve to pregnancy rates further. However, when all different types of time-lapse embryo imaging devices, with or without morphokinetic scoring systems, are compared against conventional embryo assessment for IVF, there is insufficient evidence of a difference in live-birth, pregnancy, stillbirth or miscarriage to choose between them. Active efforts to develop a more accurate embryo selection analysis based on Artificial Intelligence and Deep Learning are underway. Embryo Ranking Intelligent Classification Assistant (ERICA), is a clear example.  This Deep Learning software substitutes manual classifications with a ranking system based on an individual embryo's predicted genetic status in a non-invasive fashion. Studies on this area are still pending and current feasibility studies support its potential.

Embryo transfer

The number to be transferred depends on the number available, the age of the patient and other health and diagnostic factors. In countries such as Canada, the UK, Australia and New Zealand, a maximum of two embryos are transferred except in unusual circumstances. In the UK and according to HFEA regulations, a woman over 40 may have up to three embryos transferred, whereas in the US, there is no legal limit on the number of embryos which may be transferred, although medical associations have provided practice guidelines. Most clinics and country regulatory bodies seek to minimise the risk of multiple pregnancy, as it is not uncommon for multiple embryos to implant if multiple embryos are transferred. Embryos are transferred to the patient's uterus through a thin, plastic catheter, which goes through her vagina and cervix. Several embryos may be passed into the uterus to improve chances of implantation and pregnancy.

Luteal support

Luteal support is the administration of medication, generally progesterone, progestins, hCG, or GnRH agonists, and often accompanied by estradiol, to increase the success rate of implantation and early embryogenesis, thereby complementing and/or supporting the function of the corpus luteum. A Cochrane review found that hCG or progesterone given during the luteal phase may be associated with higher rates of live birth or ongoing pregnancy, but that the evidence is not conclusive. Co-treatment with GnRH agonists appears to improve outcomes, by a live birth rate RD of +16% (95% confidence interval +10 to +22%). On the other hand, growth hormone or aspirin as adjunctive medication in IVF have no evidence of overall benefit.

Expansions
There are various expansions or additional techniques that can be applied in IVF, which are usually not necessary for the IVF procedure itself, but would be virtually impossible or technically difficult to perform without concomitantly performing methods of IVF.

Preimplantation genetic screening or diagnosis

Preimplantation genetic screening (PGS) or preimplantation genetic diagnosis (PGD) has been suggested to be able to be used in IVF to select an embryo that appears to have the greatest chances for successful pregnancy. However, a systematic review and meta-analysis of existing randomised controlled trials came to the result that there is no evidence of a beneficial effect of PGS with cleavage-stage biopsy as measured by live birth rate. On the contrary, for women of advanced maternal age, PGS with cleavage-stage biopsy significantly lowers the live birth rate. Technical drawbacks, such as the invasiveness of the biopsy, and non-representative samples because of mosaicism are the major underlying factors for inefficacy of PGS.

Still, as an expansion of IVF, patients who can benefit from PGS/PGD include:
 Couples who have a family history of inherited disease
 Couples who want prenatal sex discernment. This can be used to diagnose monogenic disorders with sex linkage. It can potentially be used for sex selection, wherein a fetus is aborted if having an undesired sex.
 Couples who already have a child with an incurable disease and need compatible cells from a second healthy child to cure the first, resulting in a "saviour sibling" that matches the sick child in HLA type.

PGS screens for numeral chromosomal abnormalities while PGD diagnosis the specific molecular defect of the inherited disease. In both PGS and PGD, individual cells from a pre-embryo, or preferably trophectoderm cells biopsied from a blastocyst, are analysed during the IVF process. Before the transfer of a pre-embryo back to a woman's uterus, one or two cells are removed from the pre-embryos (8-cell stage), or preferably from a blastocyst. These cells are then evaluated for normality. Typically within one to two days, following completion of the evaluation, only the normal pre-embryos are transferred back to the woman's uterus.  Alternatively, a blastocyst can be cryopreserved via vitrification and transferred at a later date to the uterus.  In addition, PGS can significantly reduce the risk of multiple pregnancies because fewer embryos, ideally just one, are needed for implantation.

Cryopreservation

Cryopreservation can be performed as oocyte cryopreservation before fertilisation, or as embryo cryopreservation after fertilisation.

The Rand Consulting Group has estimated there to be 400,000 frozen embryos in the United States in 2006. The advantage is that patients who fail to conceive may become pregnant using such embryos without having to go through a full IVF cycle. Or, if pregnancy occurred, they could return later for another pregnancy.  Spare oocytes or embryos resulting from fertility treatments may be used for oocyte donation or embryo donation to another woman or couple, and embryos may be created, frozen and stored specifically for transfer and donation by using donor eggs and sperm. Also, oocyte cryopreservation can be used for women who are likely to lose their ovarian reserve due to undergoing chemotherapy.

By 2017, many centers have adopted embryo cryopreservation as their primary IVF therapy, and perform few or no fresh embryo transfers.  The two main reasons for this have been better endometrial receptivity when embryos are transferred in cycles without exposure to ovarian stimulation and also the ability to store the embryos while awaiting the results of preimplantation genetic testing.

The outcome from using cryopreserved embryos has uniformly been positive with no increase in birth defects or development abnormalities.

Other expansions
 Intracytoplasmic sperm injection (ICSI) is where a single sperm is injected directly into an egg. Its main usage as an expansion of IVF is to overcome male infertility problems, although it may also be used where eggs cannot easily be penetrated by sperm, and occasionally in conjunction with sperm donation. It can be used in teratozoospermia, since once the egg is fertilised abnormal sperm morphology does not appear to influence blastocyst development or blastocyst morphology.
 Additional methods of embryo profiling. For example, methods are emerging in making comprehensive analyses of up to entire genomes, transcriptomes, proteomes and metabolomes which may be used to score embryos by comparing the patterns with ones that have previously been found among embryos in successful versus unsuccessful pregnancies.
 Assisted zona hatching (AZH) can be performed shortly before the embryo is transferred to the uterus. A small opening is made in the outer layer surrounding the egg in order to help the embryo hatch out and aid in the implantation process of the growing embryo.
 In egg donation and embryo donation, the resultant embryo after fertilisation is inserted in another woman than the one providing the eggs. These are resources for women with no eggs due to surgery, chemotherapy, or genetic causes; or with poor egg quality, previously unsuccessful IVF cycles or advanced maternal age. In the egg donor process, eggs are retrieved from a donor's ovaries, fertilised in the laboratory with the sperm from the recipient's partner, and the resulting healthy embryos are returned to the recipient's uterus.
 In oocyte selection, the oocytes with optimal chances of live birth can be chosen. It can also be used as a means of preimplantation genetic screening.
 Embryo splitting can be used for twinning to increase the number of available embryos.
Cytoplasmic transfer is where the cytoplasm from a donor egg is injected into an egg with compromised mitochondria. The resulting egg is then fertilised with sperm and introduced into a womb, usually that of the woman who provided the recipient egg and nuclear DNA. Cytoplasmic transfer was created to aid women who experience infertility due to deficient or damaged mitochondria, contained within an egg's cytoplasm.

Leftover embryos or eggs

There may be leftover embryos or eggs from IVF procedures if the woman for whom they were originally created has successfully carried one or more pregnancies to term, and no longer wishes to use them. With the woman's or couple's permission, these may be donated to help other women or couples as a means of third party reproduction.

In embryo donation, these extra embryos are given to other couples or women for transfer, with the goal of producing a successful pregnancy. Embryo recipients typically have genetic issues or poor-quality embryos or eggs of their own. The resulting child is considered the child of the woman who carries it and gives birth, and not the child of the donor, the same as occurs with egg donation or sperm donation.

Typically, genetic parents donate the eggs or embryos to a fertility clinic where they are preserved by oocyte cryopreservation or embryo cryopreservation until a carrier is found for them. Typically the process of matching the donation with the prospective parents is conducted by the agency itself, at which time the clinic transfers ownership of the embryos to the prospective parents.

In the United States, women seeking to be an embryo recipient undergo infectious disease screening required by the Food and Drug Administration (FDA), and reproductive tests to determine the best placement location and cycle timing before the actual embryo transfer occurs. The amount of screening the embryo has already undergone is largely dependent on the genetic parents' own IVF clinic and process. The embryo recipient may elect to have her own embryologist conduct further testing.

Alternatives to donating unused embryos are destroying them (or having them transferred at a time when pregnancy is very unlikely), keeping them frozen indefinitely, or donating them for use in research (which results in their unviability). Individual moral views on disposing of leftover embryos may depend on personal views on the beginning of human personhood and the definition and/or value of potential future persons, and on the value that is given to fundamental research questions. Some people believe donation of leftover embryos for research is a good alternative to discarding the embryos when patients receive proper, honest and clear information about the research project, the procedures and the scientific values.

History

The first successful birth of a child after IVF treatment, Louise Brown, occurred in 1978. Louise Brown was born as a result of natural cycle IVF where no stimulation was made. The procedure took place at Dr Kershaw's Cottage Hospital (now Dr Kershaw's Hospice) in Royton, Oldham, England. Robert G. Edwards, the physiologist who co-developed the treatment, was awarded the Nobel Prize in Physiology or Medicine in 2010. His co-workers, Patrick Steptoe and Jean Purdy, were not eligible for consideration as the Nobel Prize is not awarded posthumously.

The second successful birth of a 'test tube baby' occurred in India just 67 days after Louise Brown was born. The girl, named Durga, was conceived in vitro using a method developed independently by Dr Subhash Mukhopadhyay, a physician and researcher from Kolkata. Mukhopadhyay had been performing experiments on his own with primitive instruments and a household refrigerator. However, state authorities prevented him from presenting his work at scientific conferences, and it was many years before Mukhopadhyay's contribution was acknowledged in works dealing with the subject.

With egg donation and IVF, women who are past their reproductive years, have infertile male partners, have idiopathic female-fertility issues, or have reached menopause can still become pregnant. Adriana Iliescu held the record as the oldest woman to give birth using IVF and a donor egg, when she gave birth in 2004 at the age of 66, a record passed in 2006. After the IVF treatment some couples are able to get pregnant without any fertility treatments. In 2018 it was estimated that eight million children had been born worldwide using IVF and other assisted reproduction techniques.

Ethics

Mix-ups
In some cases, laboratory mix-ups (misidentified gametes, transfer of wrong embryos) have occurred, leading to legal action against the IVF provider and complex paternity suits. An example is the case of a woman in California who received the embryo of another couple and was notified of this mistake after the birth of her son. This has led to many authorities and individual clinics implementing procedures to minimise the risk of such mix-ups.  The HFEA, for example, requires clinics to use a double witnessing system,  the identity of specimens is checked by two people at each point at which specimens are transferred. Alternatively, technological solutions are gaining favour, to reduce the manpower cost of manual double witnessing, and to further reduce risks with uniquely numbered RFID tags which can be identified by readers connected to a computer. The computer tracks specimens throughout the process and alerts the embryologist if non-matching specimens are identified. Although the use of RFID tracking has expanded in the US, it is still not widely adopted.

Preimplantation genetic diagnosis or screening 
While PGD was originally designed to screen for embryos carrying hereditary genetic diseases, the method has been applied to select features that are unrelated to diseases, thus raising ethical questions. Examples of such cases include the selection of embryos based on histocompatibility (HLA) for the donation of tissues to a sick family member, the diagnosis of genetic susceptibility to disease, and sex selection.

These examples raise ethical issues because of the morality of eugenics. It becomes frowned upon because of the advantage of being able to eliminate unwanted traits and selecting desired traits. By  using PGD,  individuals are given the opportunity to create a human life unethically and rely on science and not by natural selection.

For example, a deaf British couple, Tom and Paula Lichy, have petitioned to create a deaf baby using IVF. Some medical ethicists have been very critical of this approach. Jacob M. Appel wrote that "intentionally culling out blind or deaf embryos might prevent considerable future suffering, while a policy that allowed deaf or blind parents to select for such traits intentionally would be far more troublesome."

Profit desire of the industry
In 2008, a California physician transferred 12 embryos to a woman who gave birth to octuplets (Suleman octuplets). This led to accusations that a doctor is willing to endanger the health and even life of people in order to gain money. Robert Winston, professor of fertility studies at Imperial College London, had called the industry "corrupt" and "greedy" stating that "one of the major problems facing us in healthcare is that IVF has become a massive commercial industry," and that "what has happened, of course, is that money is corrupting this whole technology", and accused authorities of failing to protect couples from exploitation: "The regulatory authority has done a consistently bad job. It's not prevented the exploitation of people, it's not put out very good information to couples, it's not limited the number of unscientific treatments people have access to". The IVF industry has been described as a market-driven construction of health, medicine and the human body.

In the US, the Copyright Clause provides innovators with a temporary monopoly over their respective work. As a result, IVF is prohibitively expensive for patients as providers have to also cover the costs of patents. For example, 23andMe has patented a process used to calculate the probability of gene inheritance.

The industry has been accused of making unscientific claims, and distorting facts relating to infertility, in particular through widely exaggerated claims about how common infertility is in society, in an attempt to get as many couples as possible and as soon as possible to try treatments (rather than trying to conceive naturally for a longer time). This risks removing infertility from its social context and reducing the experience to a simple biological malfunction, which not only can be treated through bio-medical procedures, but should be treated by them. Indeed, there are serious concerns about the overuse of treatments, for instance Dr Sami David, a fertility specialist, has expressed disappointment over the current state of the industry, and said many procedures are unnecessary; he said: "It's being the first choice of treatment rather than the last choice. When it was first opening up in late 1970s, early 80s, it was meant to be the last resort.  Now it's a first resort. I think that it can harm women in the long run." IVF thus raises ethical issues concerning the abuse of bio-medical facts to 'sell' corrective procedures and treatments for conditions that deviate from a constructed ideal of the 'healthy' or 'normal' body i.e., fertile females and males with reproductive systems capable of co-producing offspring.

IVF over age 40 
All pregnancies can be risky, but there are greater risk for women who are older and are over the age of 40. The older the woman the riskier the pregnancy. As women get older, they are more likely to develop conditions such as gestational diabetes and pre-eclampsia. If older women do conceive over the age of 40, their offspring may be of lower birth weight, and more likely to requires intensive care. Because of this, the increased risk is a sufficient cause for concern. The high incidence of caesarean in older mothers is commonly regarded as a risk.

Though there are some risk with older pregnancies, there are some benefits associated with caesareans. A study has shown that births over 40 have a lower rate of birth trauma due to increased delivery by caesarean. Though caesarean is seen to benefit mothers over 40, there are still many risk factors to consider. Caesarean section may be a risk in the same way that gestational diabetes is.

Women conceiving at 40 have a greater risk of gestational hypertension and premature birth. The offspring is at risk when being born from older mothers, and the risks associated with being conceived through IVF.

Adriana Iliescu held the record for a while as the oldest woman to give birth using IVF and a donor egg, when she gave birth in 2004 at the age of 66. In September 2019, a  74-year-old woman became the oldest-ever to give birth after she delivered twins at a hospital in Guntur, Andhra Pradesh.

Pregnancy after menopause 
Although menopause is a natural barrier to further conception, IVF has allowed women to be pregnant in their fifties and sixties. Women whose uteruses have been appropriately prepared receive embryos that originated from an egg of an egg donor. Therefore, although these women do not have a genetic link with the child, they have a physical link through pregnancy and childbirth. In many cases the genetic father of the child is the woman's partner. Even after menopause the uterus is fully capable of carrying out a pregnancy.

Same-sex couples, single and unmarried parents

A 2009 statement from the ASRM found no persuasive evidence that children are harmed or disadvantaged solely by being raised by single parents, unmarried parents, or homosexual parents. It did not support restricting access to assisted reproductive technologies on the basis of a prospective parent's marital status or sexual orientation. A 2018 study found that children's psychological well-being did not differ when raised by either same-sex parents or heterosexual parents, even finding that psychological well-being was better amongst children raised by same-sex parents.

Ethical concerns include reproductive rights, the welfare of offspring, nondiscrimination against unmarried individuals, homosexual, and professional autonomy.

A controversy in California focused on the question of whether physicians opposed to same-sex relationships should be required to perform IVF for a lesbian couple. Guadalupe T. Benitez, a lesbian medical assistant from San Diego, sued doctors Christine Brody and Douglas Fenton of the North Coast Woman's Care Medical Group after Brody told her that she had "religious-based objections to treating her and homosexuals in general to help them conceive children by artificial insemination," and Fenton refused to authorise a refill of her prescription for the fertility drug Clomid on the same grounds. The California Medical Association had initially sided with Brody and Fenton, but the case, North Coast Women's Care Medical Group v. Superior Court, was decided unanimously by the California State Supreme Court in favour of Benitez on 19 August 2008.

Nadya Suleman came to international attention after having twelve embryos implanted, eight of which survived, resulting in eight newborns being added to her existing six-child family. The Medical Board of California sought to have fertility doctor Michael Kamrava, who treated Suleman, stripped of his licence. State officials allege that performing Suleman's procedure is evidence of unreasonable judgment, substandard care, and a lack of concern for the eight children she would conceive and the six she was already struggling to raise. On 1 June 2011 the Medical Board issued a ruling that Kamrava's medical licence be revoked effective 1 July 2011.

Transgender parents 
The research and literature on transgender reproduction and family planning today remains extremely limited. There is, however, no evidence to suggest that children of transgender parents are disadvantaged. A study done in France compared the children of transgender fathers to children of cisgender parents and found the childhood development of both groups to be the same and the psycho-emotional health of the children of transgender parents to be good.

A 2020 literature review clearly shows that transgender men and women can experience many obstacles and challenges achieving pregnancy and forming families. These issues stem from the cis-normative structure within United States medical system that leads to transphobic discrimination. Ethical concerns include reproductive rights, reproductive justice, physician autonomy, and transphobia within the health care setting.

Anonymous donors

Some children conceived by IVF using anonymous donors report being troubled over not knowing about their donor parent as well any genetic relatives they may have and their family history.

Alana Stewart, who was conceived using donor sperm, began an online forum for donor children called AnonymousUS in 2010. The forum welcomes the viewpoints of anyone involved in the IVF process. Olivia Pratten, a donor-conceived Canadian, sued the province of British Columbia for access to records on her donor father's identity in 2008. "I'm not a treatment, I'm a person, and those records belong to me," Pratten said. In May 2012, a court ruled in Pratten's favour, agreeing that the laws at the time discriminated against donor children and making anonymous sperm and egg donation in British Columbia illegal.

In the U.K., Sweden, Norway, Germany, Italy, New Zealand, and some Australian states, donors are not paid and cannot be anonymous.

In 2000, a website called Donor Sibling Registry was created to help biological children with a common donor connect with each other.

In 2012, a documentary called Anonymous Father's Day was released that focuses on donor-conceived children.

Unwanted embryos 

During the selection and transfer phases, many embryos may be discarded in favour of others. This selection may be based on criteria such as genetic disorders or the sex. One of the earliest cases of special gene selection through IVF was the case of the Collins family in the 1990s, who selected the sex of their child.  The ethic issues remain unresolved as no consensus exists in science, religion, and philosophy on when a human embryo should be recognised as a person. For those who believe that this is at the moment of conception, IVF becomes a moral question when multiple eggs are fertilised, begin development, and only a few are chosen for uterus transfer.

If IVF were to involve the fertilisation of only a single egg, or at least only the number that will be transferred, then this would not be an issue. However, this has the chance of increasing costs dramatically as only a few eggs can be attempted at a time.  As a result, the couple must decide what to do with these extra embryos. Depending on their view of the embryo's humanity or the chance the couple will want to try to have another child, the couple has multiple options for dealing with these extra embryos. Couples can choose to keep them frozen, donate them to other infertile couples, thaw them, or donate them to medical research. Keeping them frozen costs money, donating them does not ensure they will survive, thawing them renders them immediately unviable, and medical research results in their termination. In the realm of medical research, the couple is not necessarily told what the embryos will be used for, and as a result, some can be used in stem cell research, a field perceived to have ethical issues.

Religious response

The Catholic Church opposes all kinds of assisted reproductive technology and artificial contraception, on the grounds that they separate the procreative goal of marital sex from the goal of uniting married couples.
The Catholic Church permits the use of a small number of reproductive technologies and contraceptive methods such as natural family planning, which involves charting ovulation times, and allows other forms of reproductive technologies that allow conception to take place from normative sexual intercourse, such as a fertility lubricant. Pope Benedict XVI had publicly re-emphasised the Catholic Church's opposition to in vitro fertilisation, saying that it replaces love between a husband and wife.

The Catechism of the Catholic Church, in accordance with the Catholic understanding of natural law, teaches that reproduction has an "inseparable connection" to the sexual union of married couples. In addition, the church opposes IVF because it might result in the disposal of embryos; in Catholicism, an embryo is viewed as an individual with a soul that must be treated as a person. The Catholic Church maintains that it is not objectively evil to be infertile, and advocates adoption as an option for such couples who still wish to have children.

Hindus welcome IVF as a gift for those who are unable to bear children and have declared doctors related to IVF to be conducting punya as there are several characters who were claimed to be born without intercourse, mainly Kaurav and five Pandavas.

Regarding the response to IVF by Islam, a general consensus from the contemporary Sunni scholars concludes that IVF methods are immoral and prohibited. However, Gad El-Hak Ali Gad El-Hak's ART fatwa includes that:
IVF of an egg from the wife with the sperm of her husband and the transfer of the fertilised egg back to the uterus of the wife is allowed, provided that the procedure is indicated for a medical reason and is carried out by an expert physician.
Since marriage is a contract between the wife and husband during the span of their marriage, no third party should intrude into the marital functions of sex and procreation. This means that a third party donor is not acceptable, whether he or she is providing sperm, eggs, embryos, or a uterus. The use of a third party is tantamount to zina, or adultery.

Within the Orthodox Jewish community the concept is debated as there is little precedent in traditional Jewish legal textual sources. Regarding laws of sexuality, religious challenges include masturbation (which may be regarded as "seed wasting"), laws related to sexual activity and menstruation (niddah) and the specific laws regarding intercourse. An additional major issue is that of establishing paternity and lineage. For a baby conceived naturally, the father's identity is determined by a legal presumption (chazakah) of legitimacy: rov bi'ot achar ha'baal – a woman's sexual relations are assumed to be with her husband. Regarding an IVF child, this assumption does not exist and as such Rabbi Eliezer Waldenberg (among others) requires an outside supervisor to positively identify the father. Reform Judaism has generally approved IVF.

Society and culture

Many women of sub-Saharan Africa choose to foster their children to infertile women. IVF enables these infertile women to have their own children, which imposes new ideals to a culture in which fostering children is seen as both natural and culturally important. Many infertile women are able to earn more respect in their society by taking care of the children of other mothers, and this may be lost if they choose to use IVF instead. As IVF is seen as unnatural, it may even hinder their societal position as opposed to making them equal with fertile women. It is also economically advantageous for infertile women to raise foster children as it gives these children greater ability to access resources that are important for their development and also aids the development of their society at large. If IVF becomes more popular without the birth rate decreasing, there could be more large family homes with fewer options to send their newborn children. This could result in an increase of orphaned children and/or a decrease in resources for the children of large families. This would ultimately stifle the children's and the community's growth.

In the US, the pineapple has emerged as a symbol of IVF users, possibly because some people thought, without scientific evidence, that eating pineapple might slightly increase the success rate for the procedure.

LGBTQ+ community and IVF

Same-sex couples 
In larger urban centres, studies have noted that lesbian, gay, bisexual, transgender and queer (LGBTQ+) populations are among the fastest-growing users of fertility care. IVF is increasingly being used to allow lesbian and other LGBT couples to share in the reproductive process through a technique called reciprocal IVF. The eggs of one partner are used to create embryos which the other partner carries through pregnancy. For gay male couples, many elect to use IVF through gestational surrogacy, where one partner's sperm is used to fertilise a donor ovum, and the resulting embryo is transplanted into a surrogate carrier's womb. There are various IVF options available for same-sex couples including, but not limited to, IVF with donor sperm, IVF with a partner’s oocytes, reciprocal IVF, IVF with donor eggs, and IVF with gestational surrogate. IVF with donor sperm can be considered traditional IVF for lesbian couples, but reciprocal IVF or using a partner’s oocytes are other options for lesbian couples trying to conceive to include both partners in the biological process. Using a partner’s oocytes is an option for partners who are unsuccessful in conceiving with their own, and reciprocal IVF involves undergoing reproduction with a donor egg and sperm that is then transferred to a partner who will gestate. Donor IVF involves conceiving with a third party’s eggs. Typically, for gay male couples hoping to use IVF, the common techniques are using IVF with donor eggs and gestational surrogates.

Transgender parents 
Many LGBT communities centre their support around cisgender gay, lesbian and bisexual people and neglect to include proper support for transgender people. The same 2020 literature review analyses the social, emotional and physical experiences of pregnant transgender men. A common obstacle faced by pregnant transgender men is the possibility of gender dysphoria. Literature shows that transgender men report uncomfortable procedures and interactions during their pregnancies as well as feeling misgendered due to gendered terminology used by healthcare providers. Outside of the healthcare system, pregnant transgender men may experience gender dysphoria due to cultural assumptions that all pregnant people are cisgender women. These people use three common approaches to navigating their pregnancy: passing as a cisgender woman, hiding their pregnancy, or being out and visibly pregnant as a transgender man. Some transgender and gender diverse patients describe their experience in seeking gynaecological and reproductive health care as isolating and discriminatory, as the strictly binary healthcare system often leads to denial of healthcare coverage or unnecessary revelation of their transgender status to their employer.

Many transgender people retain their original sex organs and choose to have children through biological reproduction. Advances in assisted reproductive technology and fertility preservation have broadened the options transgender people have to conceive a child using their own gametes or a donor's. Transgender men and women may opt for fertility preservation before any gender affirming surgery, but it is not required for future biological reproduction. It is also recommended that fertility preservation is conducted before any hormone therapy. Additionally, while fertility specialists often suggest that transgender men discontinue their testosterone hormones prior to pregnancy, research on this topic is still inconclusive. However, a 2019 study found that transgender male patients seeking oocyte retrieval via assisted reproductive technology (including IVF) were able to undergo treatment four months after stopping testosterone treatment, on average. All patients experienced menses and normal AMH, FSH and E2 levels and antral follicle counts after coming off testosterone, which allowed for successful oocyte retrieval. Despite assumptions that the long-term androgen treatment negatively impacts fertility, oocyte retrieval, an integral part of the IVF process, does not appear to be affected.

Biological reproductive options available to transgender women include, but are not limited to, IVF and IUI with the trans woman's sperm and a donor or a partner's eggs and uterus. Fertility treatment options for transgender men include, but are not limited to, IUI or IVF using his own eggs with a donor's sperm and/or donor's eggs, his uterus, or a different uterus, whether that is a partner's or a surrogate's.

Emotional involvement with children 
Studies have indicated that IVF mothers show greater emotional involvement with their child, and they enjoy motherhood more than mothers by natural conception. Similarly, studies have indicated that IVF fathers express more warmth and emotional involvement than fathers by adoption and natural conception and enjoy fatherhood more. Some IVF parents become overly involved with their children.

Men and IVF
Research has shown that men largely view themselves as "passive contributors" since they have "less physical involvement" in IVF treatment. Despite this, many men feel distressed after seeing the toll of hormonal injections and ongoing physical intervention on their female partner. Fertility was found to be a significant factor in a man's perception of his masculinity, driving many to keep the treatment a secret. In cases where the men did share that he and his partner were undergoing IVF, they reported to have been teased, mainly by other men, although some viewed this as an affirmation of support and friendship. For others, this led to feeling socially isolated.  In comparison with females, males showed less deterioration in mental health in the years following a failed treatment. However, many men did feel guilt, disappointment and inadequacy, stating that they were simply trying to provide an "emotional rock" for their partners.

Cost of IVF 
Costs of IVF can be broken down into direct and indirect costs. Direct costs include the medical treatments themselves, including doctor consultations, medications, ultrasound scanning, laboratory tests, the actual IVF procedure, and any associated hospital charges and administrative costs. Indirect costs includes the cost of addressing any complications with treatments, compensation for the gestational surrogate, patients' travel costs, and lost hours of productivity. These costs can be exaggerated by the increasing age of the woman undergoing IVF treatment (particularly those over the age of 40), and the increase costs associated with multiple births. For instance, a pregnancy with twins can cost up to three times that of a singleton pregnancy. While some insurances cover one cycle of IVF, it takes multiple cycles of IVF to have a successful outcome. A study completed in Northern California reveals that the IVF procedure alone that results in a successful outcome costs $61,377, and this can be more costly with the use of a donor egg.

In the US, nineteen states have laws requiring insurance coverage for infertility treatment, and thirteen of those specifically include IVF. These states that mandate IVF coverage are: Arkansas, California, Colorado, Connecticut, Delaware, Hawaii, Illinois, Louisiana, Maryland, Massachusetts, Montana, New Hampshire, New Jersey, New York, Ohio, Rhode Island, Texas, Utah, and West Virginia. These laws differ by state but many require an egg be fertilised with sperm from a spouse and that in order to be covered you must show you cannot become pregnant through penile-vaginal sex. These requirements are not possible for a same-sex couple to meet. No state Medicaid program, however, covers for IVF according to a 2020 report.

Navigating insurance coverage for transgender expectant parents presents a unique challenge. Insurance plans are designed to cater towards a specific population, meaning that some plans can provide adequate coverage for gender-affirming care but fail to provide fertility services for transgender patients. Additionally, insurance coverage is constructed around a person's legally recognised sex and not their anatomy; thus, transgender people may not get coverage for the services they need, including transgender men for fertility services.

Availability and utilisation

High costs keep IVF out of reach for many developing countries, but research by the Genk Institute for Fertility Technology, in Belgium, claim to have found a much lower cost methodology (about 90% reduction) with similar efficacy, which may be suitable for some fertility treatment.
Moreover, the laws of many countries permit IVF for only single individuals, lesbian couples, and persons participating in surrogacy arrangements. Using PGD gives members of these select demographic groups disproportionate access to a means of creating a child possessing characteristics that they consider "ideal," raising issues of equal opportunity for both the parents'/parent's and the child's generation.  Many fertile couples now demand equal access to embryonic screening so that their child can be just as healthy as one created through IVF.  Mass use of PGD, especially as a means of population control or in the presence of legal measures related to population or demographic control, can lead to intentional or unintentional demographic effects such as the skewed live-birth sex ratios seen in communist China following implementation of its one-child policy.

The high cost of IVF is also a barrier to access for individuals with disabilities. People with disabilities typically have lower incomes, face higher health care costs, and seek health care services more often than people without disabilities. Adding on the high cost of multiple cycles of IVF, this deters many disabled individuals from pursuing fertility treatment and makes it completely unaccessible for most.

Australia
In Australia, the average age of women undergoing ART treatment is 35.5 years among those using their own eggs (one in four being 40 or older) and 40.5 years among those using donated eggs. While IVF is available in Australia, Australians using IVF are unable to choose their baby's gender.

Cameroon
Ernestine Gwet Bell supervised the first Cameroonian child born by IVF in 1998.

Canada 
In Canada, one cycle of IVF treatment can cost between $7,750 to $12,250 CAD, and medications alone can cost between $2,500 to over $7,000 CAD. The funding mechanisms that influence accessibility in Canada vary by province and territory, with some provinces providing full, partial or no coverage.

New Brunswick provides partial funding through their Infertility Special Assistance Fund – a one time grant of up to $5,000. Patients may only claim up to 50% of treatment costs or $5,000 (whichever is less) occurred after April 2014. Eligible patients must be a full-time New Brunswick resident with a valid Medicare card  and have an official medical infertility diagnosis by a physician.

In December 2015, the Ontario provincial government enacted the Ontario Fertility Program for patients with medical and non-medical infertility, regardless of sexual orientation, gender or family composition. Eligible patients for IVF treatment must be Ontario residents under the age of 43 and have a valid Ontario Health Insurance Plan card and have not already undergone any IVF cycles. Coverage is extensive, but not universal. Coverage extends to certain blood and urine tests, physician/nurse counselling and consultations, certain ultrasounds, up to two cycle monitorings, embryo thawing, freezing and culture, fertilisation and embryology services, single transfers of all embryos, and one surgical sperm retrieval using certain techniques only if necessary. Drugs and medications are not covered under this Program, along with psychologist or social worker counselling, storage and shipping of eggs, sperm or embryos, and the purchase of donor sperm or eggs.

China 
IVF is expensive in China and not generally accessible to unmarried women. In August 2022, China's National Health Authority announced that it will take steps to make assisted reproductive technology more accessible, including by guiding local governments to include such technology in its national medical system.

India 
The penetration of the IVF market in India is quite low, with only 2,800 cycles per million infertile people in the reproductive age group (20–44 years), as compared to China, which has 6,500 cycles. The key challenges are lack of awareness, affordability and accessibility. Since 2018, however, India has become a destination for fertility tourism, because of lower costs than in the Western world. In December 2021, the Lok Sabha passed the Assisted Reproductive Technology (Regulation) Bill 2020, to regulate ART services including IVF centres, sperm and egg banks.

Israel
Israel has the highest rate of IVF in the world, with 1657 procedures performed per million people per year. Couples without children can receive funding for IVF for up to two children. The same funding is available for people without children who will raise up to 2 children in a single parent home. IVF is available for people aged 18 to 45. The Israeli Health Ministry says it spends roughly $3450 per procedure.

Sweden
One, two or three IVF treatments are government subsidised for people who are younger than 40 and have no children. The rules for how many treatments are subsidised, and the upper age limit for the people, vary between different county councils. Single people are treated, and embryo adoption is allowed. There are also private clinics that offer the treatment for a fee.

United Kingdom

Availability of IVF in England is determined by Clinical Commissioning Groups (CCGs). The National Institute for Health and Care Excellence (NICE) recommends up to 3 cycles of treatment for people under 40 years old with minimal success conceiving after 2 years of unprotected sex. Cycles will not be continued for people who are older than 40 years. CCGs in Essex, Bedfordshire and Somerset have reduced funding to one cycle, or none, and it is expected that reductions will become more widespread. Funding may be available in "exceptional circumstances" – for example if a male partner has a transmittable infection or one partner is affected by cancer treatment.  According to the campaign group Fertility Fairness "at the end of 2014 every CCG in England was funding at least one cycle of IVF".  Prices paid by the NHS in England varied between under £3,000 to more than £6,000 in 2014/5. In February 2013, the cost of implementing the NICE guidelines for IVF along with other treatments for infertility was projected to be £236,000 per year per 100,000 members of the population.

IVF increasingly appears on NHS treatments blacklists.  In August 2017 five of the 208 CCGs had stopped funding IVF completely and others were considering doing so.  By October 2017 only 25 CCGs were delivering the three recommended NHS IVF cycles to eligible people under 40.  Policies could fall foul of discrimination laws if they treat same sex couples differently from heterosexual ones.  In July 2019 Jackie Doyle-Price said that women were registering with surgeries further away from their own home in order to get around CCG rationing policies.

The Human Fertilisation and Embryology Authority said in September 2018 that parents who are limited to one cycle of IVF, or have to fund it themselves, are more likely choose to implant multiple embryos in the hope it increases the chances of pregnancy.  This significantly increases the chance of multiple births and the associated poor outcomes, which would increase NHS costs.  The president of the Royal College of Obstetricians and Gynaecologists said that funding 3 cycles was  "the most important factor in maintaining low rates of multiple pregnancies and reduce(s) associated complications".

United States
In the United States, overall availability of IVF in 2005 was 2.5 IVF physicians per 100,000 population, and utilisation was 236 IVF cycles per 100,000. 126 procedures are performed per million people per year. Utilisation highly increases with availability and IVF insurance coverage, and to a significant extent also with percentage of single persons and median income.  In the US, an average cycle, from egg retrieval to embryo implantation, costs $12,400, and insurance companies that do cover treatment, even partially, usually cap the number of cycles they pay for. As of 2015, more than 1 million babies had been born utilising IVF technologies.

The cost of IVF rather reflects the costliness of the underlying healthcare system than the regulatory or funding environment, and ranges, on average for a standard IVF cycle and in 2006 United States dollars, between $12,500 in the United States to $4,000 in Japan. In Ireland, IVF costs around €4,000, with fertility drugs, if required, costing up to €3,000. The cost per live birth is highest in the United States ($41,000) and United Kingdom ($40,000) and lowest in Scandinavia and Japan (both around $24,500).

Many fertility clinics in the United States limit the upper age at which people are eligible for IVF to 50 or 55 years. These cut-offs make it difficult for people older than fifty-five to utilise the procedure.

Alternatives

Alternatives to IVF are mainly:
Artificial insemination, including intracervical insemination and intrauterine insemination of semen. It requires that a woman ovulates, but is a relatively simple procedure, and can be used in the home for self-insemination without medical practitioner assistance. The beneficiaries of artificial insemination are people who desire to give birth to their own child who may be single, people who are in a lesbian relationship or females who are in a heterosexual relationship but with a male partner who is infertile or who has a physical impairment which prevents full intercourse from taking place.
Ovulation induction (in the sense of medical treatment aiming for the development of one or two ovulatory follicles) is an alternative for people with anovulation or oligoovulation, since it is less expensive and more easy to control. It generally involves antiestrogens such as clomifene citrate or letrozole, and is followed by natural or artificial insemination.
Surrogacy, the process in which a surrogate agrees to bear a child for another person or persons, who will become the child's parent(s) after birth. People may seek a surrogacy arrangement when pregnancy is medically impossible, when pregnancy risks are too dangerous for the intended gestational carrier, or when a single man or a male couple wish to have a child. "All in My Family" is a documentary that immerses viewers into the life of a gay couple pursuing surrogacy as a means to form their own family. 
Adoption whereby a person assumes the parenting of another, usually a child, from that person's biological or legal parent or parents.

Legal status
Government agencies in China passed bans on the use of IVF in 2003 by unmarried people or by couples with certain infectious diseases.

In India, the use of IVF as a means of sex selection (preimplantation genetic diagnosis) is banned under the Pre-Conception and Pre-Natal Diagnostic Techniques Act, 1994.

Sunni Muslim nations generally allow IVF between married couples when conducted with their own respective sperm and eggs, but not with donor eggs from other couples. But Iran, which is Shi'a Muslim, has a more complex scheme. Iran bans sperm donation but allows donation of both fertilised and unfertilised eggs. Fertilised eggs are donated from married couples to other married couples, while unfertilised eggs are donated in the context of mut'ah or temporary marriage to the father.

By 2012 Costa Rica was the only country in the world with a complete ban on IVF technology, it having been ruled unconstitutional by the nation's Supreme Court because it "violated life." Costa Rica had been the only country in the western hemisphere that forbade IVF.  A law project sent reluctantly by the government of President Laura Chinchilla was rejected by parliament. President Chinchilla has not publicly stated her position on the question of IVF. However, given the massive influence of the Catholic Church in her government any change in the status quo seems very unlikely. In spite of Costa Rican government and strong religious opposition, the IVF ban has been struck down by the Inter-American Court of Human Rights in a decision of 20 December 2012. The court said that a long-standing Costa Rican guarantee of protection for every human embryo violated the reproductive freedom of infertile couples because it prohibited them from using IVF, which often involves the disposal of embryos not implanted in a woman's uterus. On 10 September 2015, President Luis Guillermo Solís signed a decree legalising in-vitro fertilisation. The decree was added to the country's official gazette on 11 September. Opponents of the practice have since filed a lawsuit before the country's Constitutional Court.

All major restrictions on single but infertile people using IVF were lifted in Australia in 2002 after a final appeal to the Australian High Court was rejected on procedural grounds in the Leesa Meldrum case. A Victorian federal court had ruled in 2000 that the existing ban on all single women and lesbians using IVF constituted sex discrimination. Victoria's government announced changes to its IVF law in 2007 eliminating remaining restrictions on fertile single women and lesbians, leaving South Australia as the only state maintaining them.

Federal regulations in the United States include screening requirements and restrictions on donations, but generally do not affect sexually intimate partners. However, doctors may be required to provide treatments due to nondiscrimination laws, as for example in California. The US state of Tennessee proposed a bill in 2009 that would have defined donor IVF as adoption. During the same session another bill proposed barring adoption from any unmarried and cohabitating couple, and activist groups stated that passing the first bill would effectively stop unmarried women from using IVF. Neither of these bills passed.

Few American courts have addressed the issue of the "property" status of a frozen embryo.  This issue might arise in the context of a divorce case, in which a court would need to determine which spouse would be able to decide the disposition of the embryos.  It could also arise in the context of a dispute between a sperm donor and egg donor, even if they were unmarried.  In 2015, an Illinois court held that such disputes could be decided by reference to any contract between the parents-to-be.  In the absence of a contract, the court would weigh the relative interests of the parties.

Disability and IVF 
Individuals with disabilities are just as entitled to equitable access to fertility treatment such as IVF as individuals without disabilities. However, most of the time this access is not granted. In fact, people with disabilities who wish to have children are equally or more likely than the non-disabled population to experience infertility, yet disabled individuals are much less likely to have access to fertility treatment such as IVF. There are many extraneous factors that hinder disabled individuals access to IVF, such as assumptions about decision making capacity, sexual interests and abilities, heritability of a disability, and beliefs about parenting ability. Assumptions like these may be the reason that people with disabilities unjustly receive less access to medically indicated reproductive care than other people of similar age and sex. These same misconceptions about people with disabilities that once led health care providers to sterilise thousands of women with disabilities now lead them to provide or deny reproductive care on the basis of stereotypes concerning people with disabilities and their sexuality.

Not only do misconceptions about disabled individuals parenting ability, sexuality, and health restrict and hinder access to fertility treatment such as IVF, structural barriers such as providers uneducated in disability healthcare and inaccessible clinics severely hinder disabled individuals access to receiving IVF. Non handicap accessible buildings, medical equipment, exam tables, etc. are all barriers that make accessing IVF almost impossible for individuals with disabilities. A woman named Nia shares her story on how accessing IVF as a disabled blind person was extremely difficult, if not almost impossible. She tells us how transportation to the clinic was inaccessible for a disabled individual, the medication given for IVF was extremely hard to self administer, and her providers were uninformed on how to make the IVF process disability accessible. Stories like Nia's show us how  fertility treatment such as IVF are inequitably inaccessible for disabled individuals and why they need to be disability friendly in order to protect the right to parent for individuals with disabilities.

There are obvious indications that access to IVF and similar fertility treatments are much less accessible for individuals with disabilities. Even though the ASRM states that "children thrive within a wide range of parenting approaches or homes" as well as that it is "inaccurate to assume that being disabled means having no sexual or reproductive interests or being sexually inactive, celibate, or asexual, assumptions about disabled individuals sexuality and parenting ability paired with uniformed providers and lack of accessible clinics and medical equipment hinder access to fertility treatment such as IVF for disabled individuals. Steps need to be taken to make the field of fertility accessible to all, and protect the right to start a family despite ability level.

See also 
 Semen cryopreservation
 Evans v United Kingdom, a key case at the European Court of Human Rights
 Sex selection
 Stem cell controversy
 Reciprocal IVF
 Test Tube Babies (film)

References

Further reading

External links 
 
 

 
Fertility
Female genital procedures
Cryobiology
Fertility medicine
Obstetrics
Human pregnancy
Reproduction
British inventions
1977 introductions
Egg donation
Sperm donation